"Pivni" is the first maxi-single released by Katya Chilly on July 1, 2005. The original lyrics of Pivni (Roostes) is based on a traditional Ukrainian song Ne Spivayte Pivni (Roosters, don't sing). That was the first song written by Katya for the Ya Molodaya album. The futuristic video for this song was sent later to all Ukrainian music channels.

Track listing
 Pivni - 3:26
 Ponad Hmaramy (feat. Sashko Polozhinskiy) - 4:29
 Pivni (LP Mix) - 4:20
 Pivni (Trance Mix) - 3:58
 Pivni (Edit Lite) - 3:39
 Pivni (PRG-MRS mix) - 4:51
 Pivni (House Club Mix) - 3:55
 Pivni (DJ Lemon Mix) - 4:29
 Pivni (Instrumental) - 3:24
 BONUS: Pivni (Music video)

2005 singles
Synth-pop songs